HYN may refer to:
 Haryanwala railway station, in Pakistan
 Hyndland railway station, in Glasgow, Scotland
 Taizhou Luqiao Airport, in Zhejiang Province, China